The Phone is an American reality television show of six episodes, based on the Dutch version of the same name. The show aired on Fridays at 10:00 p.m. Eastern time on MTV.

Format

The Phone is a 2009 reality series that locates its contestants on the street. The two contestants are two people who, some months before filming, had registered to take part in a mysterious game. The chosen players answer one of two ringing phones placed in separate locations. Once a person answers the phone, they are asked by the show's host, "The Operator" (Emmett Scanlan), if they would like the chance to win up to $50,000. If the offer is accepted, the game begins by activating a scenario similar to a movie scene, such as in the premiere episode: the game began with a car exploding and The Operator explaining that a mad bomber was loose, and the contestant's task was to stop the bomber and bring him to justice). The players were then given a series of instructions to follow to complete various tasks, known as "Missions", that have some level of involvement with the situation. Additionally, the players are informed to keep in mind everything that they see and hear over the course of the adventure, for it will have some bearing in the game later on.

Later, a set of two more phones ring and The Operator contacts two other pre-selected contestants. The Operator gives the players instructions to complete another task that will eventually link them up with their prospective partners. If the task is completed, then the team(s) receive(s) $5,000 for a successful mission, and nothing if the task is failed. The money is virtually deposited to a joint account that the team controls until the end of the game. With the teams now linked, The Operator then gives them their next task to complete.  For the rest of the game, The Operator communicates with the teams through the phones via a call, text message, or a video message. The next task is then explained, with the teams being informed that the team that completes the task will receive $10,000 into the joint account and the other team will be immediately eliminated from the game. With one team eliminated, the sole remaining team plays the remainder of the game and takes on the next part of the mission challenge. The team is then informed that if this task is completed then $15,000 is wired to the team account.

Next, The Operator will ask one of the team members to step away from the other and give them the instructions for the final part of the mission challenge. The challenge will have a catch: if the person who is separated takes on the challenge themselves, the team will have $10,000 wired for a successful mission. However, if they elect to send their partner then the money will be doubled to $20,000. If the team had successfully completed the earlier tasks, this would increase its final bank balance to the maximum total of $50,000. After 30 seconds, The Operator will ask for the player's decision.

Finally, the team is told their final bank total, but then The Operator informs them that only one member of the team will be able to take the bank home. This is determined by a quiz that will question both players on what they saw and heard during their adventure. They are asked a series of multiple-choice questions and the first person to score three points will win the money and be shown by The Operator the location of the money. The player can get to the cash, but the game is not over until one final decision is made by the winner: The Operator states that the winner has the option to take the entire bank for themselves or split the money with their partner. The Operator gives the player 1 minute to decide and then texts the phone number of the winner to the partner, which the partner then calls to receive their answer.

Jessie Godderz, known for Big Brother, was initially chosen to play the character of The Operator, but was forced to decline due to his contract restrictions with CBS.

Ratings
The first episode of The Phone was watched by a hugely disappointing 920,000 viewers.

Episodes

References

External links
 

2009 American television series debuts
2009 American television series endings
2000s American reality television series
2000s American game shows
MTV game shows
Telephony in popular culture
Television shows set in Seattle
Television shows set in Boston
Television shows set in Los Angeles